Cerro Pantojo is an extinct basaltic stratovolcano on the border of Argentina and Chile. It lies immediately south of Cardenal Antonio Samoré Pass and its characteristic spire-shaped summit is an eroded volcanic plug. It also has flank lava flows.

See also
List of volcanoes in Chile
List of volcanoes in Argentina

References
 
 

Stratovolcanoes of Chile
Andean Volcanic Belt
Volcanic plugs of South America
Mountains of Argentina
Mountains of Los Lagos Region
Nahuel Huapi National Park
Volcanoes of Los Lagos Region
Volcanoes of Neuquén Province
Polygenetic volcanoes
Extinct volcanoes
Pleistocene stratovolcanoes
Quaternary South America